Vanuatu competed at the 2015 Pacific Games in Port Moresby, Papua New Guinea from 4 to 18 July 2015. Vanuatu listed 161 competitors as of 4 July 2015.

Athletics

Vanuatu qualified 17 athletes in track and field:

Women
 Janice Alatoa
 Jeannine Alatoa
 Judithe Alatoa
 Anna Lisa Batick
 Lily Iawantak
 Brandy Mento
 Fiona Tabi

Men
 Posco Laupas
 Samson Laus
 George Vinjeria Molisingi
 Paul Wilson Nalau
 John Samson
 Markly Simeon
 Bradly Toa

Parasport
Women
 Mary Mali Ramel

Men
 Rodney Sam Ben
 Lenold Gogorai

Beach volleyball

Vanuatu qualified four athletes in beach volleyball:

Women
 Loti Joe
 Leeslyn Ler

Men
 Stephen Ham Reuben
 Isaac Mael

Boxing

Vanuatu qualified eight athletes in boxing:

Men
 Daniel Iata
 Batick Kamty
 Jean Leonce Nauka
 Fred Nepakou
 Masing Jonathan Thu
 Boe Warawara
 Masing Warawara
 Robert Waritam

Cricket

Vanuatu qualified men's and women's cricket teams (total of 29 players):

Women
 Rachel Andrew
 Judy Avok
 Jessica Chilia
 Leimaure Chilia
 Ruth Avis Kaltongga
 Valenta Langiatu
 Serah Mansale
 Selinda Tastuki Matautava
 Marcelina Mete
 Flora Nabanga
 Nasimana Navaika
 Christelle Johanna Sokomanu
 Selina Solman
 Mahina Tarimala

Men
 Callum Blake
 Jelany W. Chilia
 Johnathan Dunn
 Wolford Kalworai
 Trevor Langa
 Andrew Mansale
 Patrick K. Matautaava
 Nalin Nipiko
 Simpson Hopeman Obed
 Joshua Rasu
 Shem Simeon Sala
 Apolinaire Stephen
 Kenny Tari
 Ronald Tari
 Niko Georges Unavalu

Field hockey

Vanuatu qualified men's and women's hockey fives teams (total of 18 players):

Women
 Roylani Apia
 Anna Job
 Kathleen Kalsav-Aru
 Christina Kalsong
 Evelyn Kalsong
 Helen Kawiel
 Belinda Nampas
 Mary Siro
 Jocelyn Toara

Men
 Morres Aromalo
 Henry Homry
 Nalpinie Iasi
 John Iawila
 Michel John
 John Johnas
 Jerry Kalnangisu
 Hiro Namu
 Ben Sam

Football

Vanuatu qualified a men's football team (total of 23 players):

Men
 Chris Andrews
 Michel Kalmalap Coulon
 Raoul Charles Coulon
 Dalong Damelip
 Kaloran Firiam
 Selonie Iaruel
 Bong Kalo
 Remy Kalsrap
 Brian Kaltack
 Jean Kaltack
 Tony Kaltack
 Jaise Malsaranie
 Barry Mansale
 Zicka Manuhi
 Patti Bill Nicholls
 Nilua Nickson Nikiau
 Channel Obed
 Abraham Roqara
 Nemani Roqara
 Jacky Axiel Ruben
 Kevin Shem
 Anthony Taiwia
 Junia Norman Vava

Golf

Vanuatu qualified five athletes in golf:

Men
 Christopher George
 Stanley Malapa
 Clement Mansale
 Josepho Husman Matauatu
 Jonathan Naupa

Karate

Vanuatu qualified nine athletes in karate:

Women
 Stephane Breton
 Vamule Vassy Mata Lango

Men
 Arnold Bonga
 Johnny Rosses Laau
 Tumu Lango
 Stephen Tarip Manaruru
 Michael Matai
 Jean Christophe Runa
 Steven Edward Tumu

Netball

Vanuatu qualified a netball team (total of 12 players):

Women
 Lavinia Aromalo
 Nelline Buetari
 Royline Charlie
 Aileen Huri
 Vanessa Laloyer
 Pauline Malanga
 Monua Nalisa
 Kathy Sogari
 Stephany Tarileo
 Charlotte Temakon
 Lilian Willie
 Roselyne Willy

Rugby sevens

Vanuatu qualified a men's rugby sevens team (total of 12 players):

Men
 Omari Kalmet Bakokoto
 Waute Chichirua
 Taputu Kalpukai
 Aquila Ita Kalsakau
 Koko Kalsal
 Malau Tevita Tai Manaroto
 Claude Raymond
 Antoine Sablan
 George Kalpausi Sablan
 Jeffrey Saurei
 Steven Jacob Shem
 Graham Malon Tungan

Table tennis

Vanuatu qualified ten athletes in table tennis:

Women
 Roanna Abel
 Rosanna Abel
 Anolyn Flyn Flyn Lulu
 Stephanie Qwea
 Liopa Liupekena Lupekina Santhy

Men
 Alan Lam
 Ham Frexly Frexly Lulu
 Samuel Saul
 Yoshua Jordan Jordan Shing
 Randy William

Taekwondo

Vanuatu qualified eight athletes in taekwondo:

Men
 Bruce Johnathanhttp://www.dailypost.vu/vanuatu_sports/article_33716a7b-dbbe-5fb2-8512-d54d0bae2b6e.html
 James Pita Johnny
 Patrice Kuautonga
 Alfred Loli
 Joseph Mackie
 Sairo Yaruel Nimisa
 Freddy Saksak
 Ian Tasso

Tennis

Vanuatu qualified five athletes in tennis:

Women
 Lorraine Banimataku
 Daisy Rose Sipiti

Men
 Cyril Jacobe
 Aymeric Mara
 Leniker Jeremiah Thomas

Weightlifting

Vanuatu qualified one athlete in weightlifting:

Men
 Pala Basil Mera Molisa

References

2015 in Vanuatuan sport
Nations at the 2015 Pacific Games
Vanuatu at the Pacific Games